Leopold de Rothschild  (22 November 1845 – 29 May 1917) was a British banker, thoroughbred race horse breeder, and a member of the prominent Rothschild family.

Biography

Early life
Leopold de Rothschild was the third son and youngest of the five children of Lionel de Rothschild (1808–1879) and Charlotte von Rothschild (1819–1884). He was educated at King's College School then went on to Trinity College, Cambridge.

Banking career
He entered N M Rothschild & Sons in London, the family's banking business. On the death of his uncle Baron Mayer de Rothschild in 1874, he became head of the family's banking business in London and took over most of his uncle's public offices. He also inherited Ascott House in Ascott, Buckinghamshire.

Public service
Rothschild was a DL and JP for the county of Buckinghamshire. He was invested as a Commander of the Royal Victorian Order (CVO) by King Edward VII at Buckingham Palace on 11 August 1902. He was President of the British Order of Mercy, which was awarded his wife in 1911. He was also active in the Anglo-Jewish community, serving as vice-president of the Anglo-Jewish Association, chairman of the Jewish Emigration Society, and a treasurer of the London Jewish Board of Deputies.

Thoroughbred breeding
An avid sportsman, he established Southcourt Stud in Southcote, Bedfordshire. He assembled a stable of some of the best thoroughbreds in Europe, his horses winning a number of prestigious races including The Derby, St. Leger Stakes and the 2,000 Guineas. In the Epsom Derby of 1879 and 1904, his own horses got the cup.

Personal life
In 1881, he married Marie Perugia (1862–1937). She was the daughter of the Trieste merchant Achille Perugia. Her sister Louise married Arthur Sassoon. A close friend, H.R.H. Edward, Prince of Wales attended the wedding at London's Central Synagogue. The marriage produced three sons:
 Lionel Nathan (1882–1942)
 Evelyn Achille (1886–1917)
 Anthony Gustav (1887–1961)

They resided at Gunnersbury Park, an estate that at one time had been the residence of Princess Amelia, daughter of George II. The mansion today houses the Gunnersbury Park Museum. An art collector, he owned a number of important paintings by artists such as Jan Davidszoon de Heem.

In 1912, William Tebbit attempted to assassinate him, firing five shots from a revolver at his vehicle and riddling it with bullets.

Following his death on 29 May 1917, he was interred in the family plot in the Willesden Jewish Cemetery in the North London suburb of Willesden.

Ealing Football Club (RU)
Leopold de Rothschild was the first president of Ealing Football Club (RU) and held this office from 1896 to 1914.

References

 See the list of references at: Rothschild banking family of England

1845 births
1917 deaths
English art collectors
English bankers
English racehorse owners and breeders
Owners of Epsom Derby winners
People educated at King's College School, London
Alumni of Trinity College, Cambridge
English Jews
Leopold
Commanders of the Royal Victorian Order
Leopold de Rothschild
Burials at Willesden Jewish Cemetery
Members of the Board of Deputies of British Jews
N M Rothschild & Sons people
19th-century English businesspeople